The 2002 French Grand Prix (formally the LXXXVIII Mobil 1 Grand Prix de France) was a Formula One motor race held at Magny-Cours on 21 July 2002. It was the eleventh race of the 2002 Formula One World Championship, last race on the original layout and the race in which Michael Schumacher secured his fifth World Drivers' Championship title, equalling Juan Manuel Fangio's record set over 40 years before. McLaren-Mercedes drivers Kimi Räikkönen and David Coulthard finished second and third respectively.

In a peculiar qualifying session, a heavy crash prevented Giancarlo Fisichella from qualifying for the race on medical grounds, whilst the cash-strapped Arrows, unable to reach an agreement with their sponsors, made a brief appearance in qualifying, only to have both their drivers deliberately set lap times slow enough for them to not qualify for the race.

Classification

Qualifying

Race

Championship standings after the race 
Bold text indicates the World Champion.

Drivers' Championship standings

Constructors' Championship standings

Note: Only the top five positions are included for both sets of standings.

References

French Grand Prix
French Grand Prix
Grand Prix
French Grand Prix